The Masque of Beauty was a courtly masque written by Ben Jonson, and performed in London's Whitehall Palace on 10 January 1608. It inaugurated the refurbished banquesting hall of the palace (the predecessor of Inigo Jones' building). It was a sequel to the preceding  Masque of Blackness, which had been performed three years earlier, on 6 January 1605. In The Masque of Beauty, the "daughters of Niger" of the earlier piece were shown cleansed of the black pigment they had worn on the prior occasion.

The show
Like its earlier companion piece, The Masque of Beauty was performed by Queen Anne and ladies of her court, and witnessed by King James. The number of court ladies included was increased from the twelve in Blackness to sixteen. In addition to Queen Anne, the participants were the Countesses of Arundel, Bedford, Derby, and Montgomery, and the Ladies Chichester, Walsingham, Windsor, Anne Clifford, Elizabeth Girrard, Elizabeth Guilford, Elizabeth Hatton, Mary Neville, Katherine Petre, Anne Winter, and Arbella Stuart. Gossip held that the women chosen were largely Roman Catholic.

The masquers wore costumes of orange-tawny and silver or sea-green and silver; the torchbearers were dressed as Cupids; the presenters of the masque were styled as Januarius, Boreas, Vulturnus, and Thamesis, and the musicians as "echoes and shades of old poets." A black curtain representing Night was withdrawn to display the masquers, assembled on a "Throne of Beauty" borne upon a floating island. The sixteen masquers executed two dances, which the King liked enough to see repeated; then they danced with male courtiers, in "galliards and corantoes." The final dances returned them to the Throne of Beauty. The choreography was by Thomas Giles, who also played Thamesis.

A diplomatic controversy developed around the masque, as to which foreign ambassadors were or were not invited to attend the performance. The French ambassador Antoine Lefèvre de la Boderie was irate at being omitted while the Spanish Ambassador was invited. The Venetian ambassador Zorzi Giustinian, who was invited, was among the spectators who left descriptions of the "great golden masque" they'd seen, the jewels the ladies wore, and the marvels of the stage machinery employed. He attributed the masque to Anne of Denmark, as "authoress of the whole".

John Chamberlain mentioned that a lady of lesser rank than a baroness wore jewels valued more than £100,000, and Arbella Stuart and Anne of Denmark's jewels were worth as much and more. The Spanish ambassador invited the fifteen gentlewomen who had performed in the masque to dinner at the end of the month.

Costs
The embroiderer Christopher Shawe was paid £106-7s for his work on the costumes. The total cost of producing the masque was £4000. The House of Stuart was running an annual budget deficit of £140,000 in this era; the cost of the masque represented about 3% of the annual deficit, an enormous sum to spend on a single event.

Publication
The Masque of Beauty was entered into the Stationers' Register on 21 April 1608 and published later that year by the bookseller Thomas Thorpe, in the same volume as The Masque of Blackness. Both masques were reprinted in the first folio collection of Jonson's works in 1616.

Notes

References
 Aaron, Melissa D. Global Economics. Newark, DE, University of Delaware Press, 2003.
 Chambers, E. K. The Elizabethan Stage. 4 Volumes, Oxford, Clarendon Press, 1923.
 Logan, Terence P., and Denzell S. Smith, eds. The New Intellectuals: A Survey and Bibliography of Recent Studies in English Renaissance Drama. Lincoln, NE, University of Nebraska Press, 1977.
 Orgel, Stephen. Ben Jonson: The Complete Masques. New haven, Yale University Press, 1969.
 Sullivan, Mary. Court Masques of James I: Their Influence on Shakespeare and the Public Theatres. New York, Putnam, 1913.

External links
 The Masque of Beauty online.

Masques by Ben Jonson
English Renaissance plays
1608 plays